Higher may refer to:

Music
 The Higher, a 2002–2012 American pop rock band

Albums
 Higher (Ala Boratyn album) or the title song, 2007
 Higher (Ezio album) or the title song, 2000
 Higher (Harem Scarem album) or the title song, 2003
 Higher (The Horrors album), 2012
 Higher (Life On Planet 9 album) or the title song, 2017
 Higher (Michael Bublé album) or the title song, 2022
 Higher (The Overtones album) or the title song, 2012
 Higher (Regina Belle album) or the title song, 2012
 Higher (Roch Voisine album) or the title song, 2002
 Higher (Treponem Pal album), 1997
 Higher, by Abundant Life Ministries, 2000
 Higher, by ReinXeed, 2009
 Higher, by Russell Robertson, 2008
 Higher!, by Sly and the Family Stone, 2013
 Higher, a mixtape by Remy Banks, 2015

Songs
 "Higher" (Clean Bandit song), 2021
 "Higher" (Creed song), 1999
 "Higher" (Deborah Cox song), 2013
 "Higher" (DJ Khaled song), 2019
 "Higher" (Eminem song), 2020
 "Higher" (Erik Grönwall song), 2009
 "Higher" (The Game song), 2005
 "Higher" (Gloria Estefan song), 1996
 "Higher" (Laura Tesoro song), 2017
 "Higher" (The Naked and Famous song), 2016
 "Higher" (Peter Jöback song), 2000
 "Higher" (Rihanna song), 2016
 "Higher" (The Saturdays song), 2010
 "Higher" (Sigma song), 2015
 "Higher" (Star Pilots song), 2009
 "Higher" (Taio Cruz song), 2010
 "Higher (Free)", by All About She, 2013
 "Higher", by Ally Brooke and Matoma, 2019
 "Higher", by Avenged Sevenfold from The Stage, 2016
 "Higher", by Baauer and Just Blaze, 2013
 "Higher", by Bella Taylor Smith, 2021
 "Higher", by Breakage from Foundation, 2010
 "Higher", by Budjerah from Budjerah, 2021
 "Higher", by Carly Rae Jepsen from Emotion: Side B, 2016
 "Higher", by Devin Townsend Project from Transcendence, 2016
 "Higher", by Don Diablo from Future, 2018
 "Higher", by Edenbridge from Solitaire, 2010
 "Higher", by Emeli Sandé from Kingdom Coming, 2017
 "Higher", by Gotthard from Dial Hard, 1994
 "Higher", by Heidi Montag, 2008
 "Higher", by Hilltop Hoods from Drinking from the Sun, Walking Under Stars Restrung, 2016
 "Higher", by Ice Cube from the Higher Learning film soundtrack, 1995
 "Higher", by Jason Becker from Perspective, 1996
 "Higher", by Jauz, 2016
 "Higher", by Lily Allen from No Shame, 2018
 "Higher", by Modestep, 2017
 “Higher”, by NorthTale, 2019
 "Higher", by P.O.D. from Murdered Love, 2012
 "Higher?!", by Pigeon John from And the Summertime Pool Party, 2006
 "Higher", by the Ready Set from The Bad & the Better, 2014
 "Higher", by Shawn Mendes from Wonder, 2020
 "Higher", by Sly & the Family Stone from Dance to the Music, 1968
 "I Want to Take You Higher", a reworked version by Sly & the Family Stone, 1969
 "Higher", by Social House, 2018
 "Higher", by Starstylers, 2006
 "Higher", by Sun-El Musician from African Electronic Dance Music, 2021
 "Higher", by Tiffany, 2007
 "Higher", by the Vamps from Night & Day, 2017
 "Vyshe" (Russian: Выше, "Higher"), by Nyusha, 2011

Other uses
 Higher (Scottish), a national school-leaving certificate exam and university entrance qualification
 Higher: A Historic Race to the Sky and the Making of a City, a 2003 book by Neal Bascomb

See also
 Higher and Higher (disambiguation)
 Higher Education (disambiguation)
 Take Me Higher (disambiguation)